KEDU-LP (102.3 FM) is a radio station licensed to Ruidoso, New Mexico broadcasting a format consisting of Oldies, News/Talk programming from Salem Radio Network, local talk programs, Congressional Review Radio, ESGR Radio - New Mexico (Employer Support of the Guard and Reserve), as well as news updates from SRN News.  The station is owned by Christian Business Owners of Lincoln County. President/GM Harv Twite built the station in 2003. It was the first LPFM (Low Power) station to sign-on in New Mexico.

References

External links
 

EDU-LP